Satyanarayana may refer to the Hindu god Vishnu. For the special worship offered to him see Satyanarayana Puja. Satyanarayana is a popular given name among Telugu people.

For other people with same names, see following:

 Aacharya Satyanarayana (born 1947), founder of Meera Charitable Trust in Jaipur, India
 Aarani Satyanarayana (1898–1969), Telugu film and stage actor
 Akula Satyanarayana, Indian politician from Andhra Pradesh, India
 Allu Venkata Satyanarayana (born 1940), Indian politician
 Amarapu Satyanarayana (1937–2011), Indian actor and singer
 Bendapudi Venkata Satyanarayana (1927–2005), dermatologist from Andhra Pradesh, India
 Botsa Satyanarayana (born 1958), Indian politician from Andhra Pradesh, India
 Chitturi Satyanarayana (1913–2012), Indian surgeon
 Dronamraju Satyanarayana (1933–2006), Indian politician
 Dusharla Satyanarayana, an Indian water rights activist and founder of Jala Sadhana Samithi (JSS)
 E. V. V. Satyanarayana (1956–2011), Telugu film director
 Garapaty Satyanarayana (1911–2002), Indian politician
 Garimella Satyanarayana (1893–1952), Telugu poet and Indian independence activist
 J. Satyanarayana (born 1954), retired 1977 batch IAS officer of Andhra Pradesh cadre
 K. V. Satyanarayana, Indian dancer
 Kaikala Satyanarayana (born 1935), Telugu actor
 Koccharlakota Satyanarayana (1915–1969), Telugu film and stage actor
 Koratala Satyanarayana (1923–2006), Indian politician
 Moturi Satyanarayana (1902–1995), Hindi activist and Indian Freedom fighter
 Nookala Chinna Satyanarayana (1923–2013), Indian singer
 Peela Govinda Satyanarayana, an Indian politician from the Telugu Desam Party
 Reddi Satyanarayana, Indian politician
 Sarve Satyanarayana (born 1954), Indian politician
 Satyanarayana Dasa (born 1954), Indian Gaudiya Vaisnava scholar
 Satyanarayana Nadella
 Satyanarayana Rajguru (1903–1997), Indian epigraphist and historian
 Somarapu Satyanarayana (born 1948), Indian politician
 Tangi Satyanarayana (1931–2009), Indian politician
 Urmila Satyanarayana, Indian dancer
 Vempatapu Satyanarayana (died 1970), teacher and leader of a peasant uprising in India
 Venigalla Satyanarayana (died 1918), Indian politician 
 Viswanatha Satyanarayana (1895–1976), Telugu poet

See also
 K. Satyanarayana (disambiguation)

Surnames of Indian origin